Laura Turner may refer to:

Laura Turner (sprinter) (born 1982), British track and field athlete
Laura Turner (darts player) (born 1983), British darts player
Laura Turner (singer), American singer